Jatznick is a municipality in the Vorpommern-Greifswald district, in Mecklenburg-Vorpommern in north-eastern Germany.

Geography
With almost 2,000 inhabitants, Jatznick is the largest municipality in the Uecker-Randow-Tal district. It is situated on the north-eastern edge of the Nördliche Höhenrücken, a terminal moraine that extends about 25 kilometres to the west (highest elevation in the Brohmer Berge 153 metres above sea level). North and east of Jatznick, the landscape becomes very flat (Ueckermünde Heath to the Szczecin Lagoon as well as the lowlands of the Friedländer Große Wiese). At Waldeshöhe there is the Aalsee, a water body of about 0.8 hectares.

Districts
Am Bahnhof
Blumenhagen
Belling
Groß Spiegelberg
Klein Luckow
Sandförde with Wilhelmsthal
Waldeshöhe

History
1354 the village Jatznick is mentioned for the first time in a document. The place was originally inhabited by Slavs, who gave the place its present name.

On 1 July 1950 the until then independent community of Waldeshöhe was incorporated. On 1 January 2001 the former municipality of Belling was incorporated. On 1 January 2012 the formerly independent communities of Blumenhagen and Klein Luckow were incorporated into Jatznick.

Transport
Jatznick railway station connects the area with Stralsund, Greifswald, Züssow, Angermünde, Eberswalde, Berlin, Ueckermünde and Neubrandenburg.

References

Vorpommern-Greifswald